Brassac is the name or part of the name of several communes in France:

 Brassac, Ariège, in the Ariège department
 Brassac, Tarn, in the Tarn department
 Brassac, Tarn-et-Garonne, in the Tarn-et-Garonne department
 Brassac-les-Mines, in the Puy-de-Dôme department
 Castelnau-de-Brassac, in the Tarn department
 Grand-Brassac, in the Dordogne department